|}

The Sir Henry Cecil Stakes is a Listed flat horse race in Great Britain open to three-year-old horses. It is run on the July Course at Newmarket over a distance of 1 mile (1,609 metres), and it is scheduled to take place each year in July.

History
The race was first run in 2007 as the Xplor Conditions Stakes.  It was renamed the Stubbs Stakes and upgraded to Listed status in 2013. In 2014 it was renamed in memory of Sir Henry Cecil, who died in 2013 and was British flat racing Champion Trainer 10 times. Amongst the prizes for the first running under the new name was a rose from Cecil's garden at his Warren Place stables. It is held on the opening day of Newmarket's three-day July Festival meeting.

Winners

See also
 Horse racing in Great Britain
 List of British flat horse races

References

 Racing Post:

Flat races in Great Britain
Newmarket Racecourse
Flat horse races for three-year-olds
Recurring sporting events established in 2007
2007 establishments in England